Ryuko, Ryūkō or Ryūko is a unisex Japanese name and may refer to:

People
, Japanese Neo-Confucian scholar in the Edo period
, Indian-born businessman
, Japanese Shōwa period author
, Brazilian sumo wrestler
, Japanese  sumo wrestler
, Japanese member of the Supreme Court of Japan
,  Japanese professional golfer

Fictional characters
, a character from Minami Kamakura High School Girls Cycling Club
, the main protagonist from the anime series Kill la Kill
, a character from Ground Control to Psychoelectric Girl
, a detective from Doberman Deka
, a character from Crayon Shin-chan
, a character from My Hero Academia
, a character from My Hero Academia
Ryuko, the superheroine identity of the Kagami Tsurugi in Miraculous: Tales of Ladybug & Cat Noir

Other uses
"Ryūkō" (song), a 2009 song by musician Ringo Sheena

Japanese unisex given names